Washington State Knowledge Bowl is an academic competition for high school students in Washington State. Imported from Colorado, Olympic ESD 114 coordinated the state's first Knowledge Bowl competition during the 1980-1981 school year in which forty-two teams from the region's fifteen high schools competed.

Within a few years, all ESDs in the state were coordinating regional competitions and the first state tournament was held in 1983.

Regional Competitions
Each of the nine ESDs (Educational Service Districts) in Washington State hold regional Knowledge Bowl competitions. Regional competitions are held between November and early March. Each ESD decides the format that will be used in their respective regions and how many regional competitions will be held.

The regional competitions that determine which teams will advance to the state-level tournament typically take place in February or early March. The number of teams each ESD region is allotted for the state tournament varies each year with the number of schools that compete at each division (based on Washington Interscholastic Activities Association classification) in each ESD region. The top 18 teams in Divisions 4A, 2A, 1A, and 2B, and the top 12 teams in Divisions 3A and 1B, advance to the state tournament.

The ESD regions are as follows:

ESD 101 (Northeast Washington)
ESD 105 (Yakima Valley)
ESD 112 (Southwest Washington)
ESD 113 (West Central, Coast)
ESD 114 (Olympic Peninsula)
ESD 121 (Puget Sound)
ESD 123 (Southeast Washington)
ESD 171 (North Central Washington)
ESD 189 (Northwest Washington)

State Tournament
The state tournament takes place annually in March. 

The format for the state tournament begins with a written round of 50 multiple-choice questions with a 35-minute time limit. Up to six team members may participate in the written round. This is followed by four Preliminary oral rounds of 50 questions each, setting the stage for the Semi-Final and Championship rounds, also oral rounds of 50 questions each. Only four team members may compete in the oral rounds. Team member substitutions are allowed at the half-way point (after question 25) of each oral round.

Washington State Knowledge Bowl Champions

References

External links 
 ESD 101 Regional Knowledge Bowl
 ESD 105 Regional Knowledge Bowl
ESD 112 Regional Knowledge Bowl
 ESD 113 Regional Knowledge Bowl
 ESD 114 Regional Knowledge Bowl
 ESD 121 Regional Knowledge Bowl
 ESD 123 Regional Knowledge Bowl
ESD 171 Regional Knowledge Bowl
 ESD 189 Regional Knowledge Bowl
 Washington State Knowledge Bowl Tournament

Student quiz competitions